Moretz may refer to:

 Chloë Grace Moretz (born 1997), American actress
 Moretz Stadium, stadium in North Carolina